Praxoula Antoniadou Kyriacou is a Cypriot politician and businesswoman.
Praxoula is a graduate of the London School of Economics and Political Science. She carries with her 24 years of experience with the Central Bank of Cyprus, where she had also coordinated the accession negotiations with the European Union. She moved into active political life in 2006, in an effort to contribute to the reunification of Cyprus and to the attainment of Peace, cooperation and prosperity in the area of the Eastern Mediterranean. She is leading the small but dynamic political Party of the United Democrats, member of the political family of the European Liberal Democrats -ALDEParty- with a clear vision and activity towards freedom, democracy, peace, growth and respect for human rights. As a Minister of Energy, Trade, Industry & Tourism, she was fortunate to lead the discovery of natural gas offshore Cyprus, which she considers can and should be instrumental towards the achievement of Peace in Cyprus and between Cyprus and its neighbours. In this regard, she has been the co-author (bicommunal studies) of many studies about the economic benefits of peace in the area of the Eastern Mediterranean.
Upon the call of her brother Michael, she is now leading Aqua-Masters Qatar towards Qatar's 2030 Vision.

Education and career

Praxoula Antoniadou-Kyriacou was born in Nicosia where she attended the English School. She obtained her BSc and MSc in Economics at the London School of Economics.

Following her studies, she started working at the Central Bank of Cyprus. She held a managerial position with the Central Bank, where she served for 24 years. During her work at the central bank, she was engaged in macroeconomic analysis, policy formulation and management, and in statistics. She was also highly involved in European Union matters and served as coordinator of the Central Bank of Cyprus during the five-year period of the accession negotiations. She has also served as member of various committees of the European Central Bank and of EUROSTAT.

Throughout her career, Antoniadou-Kyriacou participated in a number of seminars and courses at the International Monetary Fund, the European Central Bank, EUROSTAT, the US Federal Reserve, the Bank of England, the Swiss National Bank and the Food and Agriculture Organization of the United Nations, as well as in seminars on management issues (CIIM, Dale Carnegie).

She is a member of the three ladies team of economists who have co-authored the award-winning trilogy of studies on “The Day After’’1, concerning the economic benefits to accrue to all the Cypriots, as well as to Turkey and Greece once Cyprus is reunited.

Political career

In her capacity as the President of the United Democrats, she has worked within the political family of the European Liberal Democrats trying to promote the implementation of Liberal values such as freedom, democracy and respect of human rights. In accordance with the above, the United Democrats appreciated the unanimous adoption by the European Liberal, Democrat and Reform Party, in their November 2009 Barcelona Congress, of a resolution expressing support to the efforts for the attainment of an agreed solution to the Cyprus problem that will be reunifying Cyprus on the basis of a bizonal bicommunal federation.

As President of the United Democrats, Antoniadou-Kyriacou had participated in meetings organized in Istanbul by GPoT Center, TESEV and the German Liberals’ Friedrich Naumann Stiftung, aiming at building communication bridges between Greek and Turkish Cypriots and, especially, between Cyprus and Turkey. In the context of these meetings, she had the opportunity to meet with His-All Holiness Ecumenical Patriarch Bartholomew, as well with the Turkish Prime Minister Mr. Recep Tayyip Erdoğan.

She has also been a regular and active participant of the meetings of the leaders of the Greek Cypriot and Turkish Cypriot political parties meeting at Ledra Palace.

As a Minister of Energy, Trade, Industry & Tourism, she was fortunate to lead the discovery of natural gas offshore Cyprus, which she considers can and should be instrumental towards the achievement of Peace in Cyprus and between Cyprus and its neighbours.

In this regard, she has been the co-author (bicommunal studies) of many studies about the economic benefits of peace in the area of the Eastern Mediterranean.

In late 2012 Antoniadou-Kyriacou announced her intention to be a candidate for the Cypriot Presidential elections of 2013, running with the support of her party, the United Democrats.

Personal life

Praxoula Antoniadou-Kyriacou is married to Lysandros Kyriacou-a long serving Civil Engineer Consultant- and has two children, Semeli an accomplished architect and Theodoros who is currently studying Engineering. She has a keen interest in music and she is an accomplished flautist. As an amateur musician she has participated in the television charity show 'DanSing for You' in order to help children battling cancer.

Offices held

|-

References

Living people
United Democrats politicians
Cyprus Ministers of Energy, Commerce, Industry and Tourism
Women government ministers of Cyprus
21st-century Cypriot women politicians
Year of birth missing (living people)
21st-century Cypriot politicians
Cypriot expatriates in the United Kingdom
Alumni of the London School of Economics
Cypriot economists